Mário Lima is a Brazilian actor and film and television producer. He produced and acted in many films by Brazilian filmmaker José Mojica Marins.

Filmography
My Destiny in Your Hands as Actor
Adventurer's Fate as Actor
At Midnight I'll Take Your Soul (also: producer)
This Night I'll Possess Your Corpse (also: producer)
Awakening of the Beast as Volunteer (also: producer)
The Strange World of Coffin Joe, segment The Dollmaker as burglar/rapist
Trilogy of Terror (1968 film) (actor, production assistant) Macabre Nightmare
The Prophet of Hunger as Actor (also: continuity)
End of Man as The lover
Embodiment of Evil as Funeral attendee

References

External links

Mário Lima profileMalditofilme.com

Year of birth missing (living people)
Living people
Male actors from São Paulo
Brazilian male actors
Brazilian film producers